The Surtees TS15, and it's deriative, the Surtees TS15A, are open-wheel Formula 2 race car chassis, designed, developed and built by Surtees for the European Formula Two Championship, between 1973 and 1974. German Jochen Mass won two races, and finished runner-up in the 1973 championship, with 42 points. The TS15 was powered by a naturally aspirated, Ford-Cosworth BDD four-cylinder engine, tuned by Brian Hart, to produce a respectable . It was the team's final Formula Two car.

References

Formula Two cars
Surtees racing cars
Open wheel racing cars